Guoguang or Kuokuang is a supermarket chain in Ji'an, Jiangxi, China. Its headquarters are in Qingyuan District.

In 2013 there was a rumor that the chain was for sale. As of that year there were new entrants in Ji'an's supermarket market, which had the possibility of affecting both Guoguang and Ganyuting, which were the two established companies in the region.

References

External links
 Guoguang 
 "我市国光超市仍在售“锰锅”." Jinggangshan Daily. 2012-02-23 第06版：A6—7. 

Companies based in Jiangxi
Chinese brands
Supermarkets of China